The 1975 USAC Championship Car season consisted of 13 races, beginning in Ontario, California on March 2 and concluding in Avondale, Arizona on November 9.  The USAC National Champion was A. J. Foyt and the Indianapolis 500 winner was Bobby Unser.

Schedule and results
All races running on Oval/Speedway.

 Scheduled for 500 miles, stopped early due to rain.

Final points standings

Note 1: Bobby Allison and George Follmer are not eligible for points.
Note 2: Jerry Grant scored points at Ontario but competed with an FIA license.
Note 3: Bentley Warren scored 100 points at Pocono, but forfeited those points due to a rule violation.

References
 
 
 
 
 http://media.indycar.com/pdf/2011/IICS_2011_Historical_Record_Book_INT6.pdf  (p. 221-222)

See also
 1975 Indianapolis 500

USAC Championship Car season
USAC Championship Car
1975 in American motorsport